The 1915 Maine Black Bears football team was an American football team that represented the University of Maine during the 1915 college football season. The team compiled a 6–3 record.  Charles Ruffner was the team captain.

In March 1915, Tommy Hughitt was hired as Maine's head football coach. Hughitt had been the quarterback of Fielding H. Yost's Michigan football teams from 1912 to 1914. Hughitt was credited with bringing Yost's system to Maine: "Hughitt showed the effectiveness of the Yost system of coaching by developing a bunch of green material, a team which staged a real 'comeback' after a bad start last year."

Schedule

References

Maine
Maine Black Bears football seasons
Maine Black Bears football